Kilcormac–Killoughey GAA is a Gaelic Athletic Association club located in the areas of Kilcormac and Killoughey, County Offaly, Ireland. The club was founded in 1986 and fields teams in hurling and football. The club won its first ever Offaly Senior Hurling Championship in 2012 and retained the title in 2013.

Stephen Byrne is the current manager.

Honours

 Leinster Senior Club Hurling Championship (1): 2012
 Offaly Senior Hurling Championship (4): 2012, 2013, 2014, 2017  
 Offaly Intermediate Hurling Championship (1): 2006
 Offaly Intermediate Football Championship (2): 1998, 2013
 Offaly Junior A Hurling Championship (2): 1990, 1999
 Offaly Junior Football Championship (3): 2002, 2006, 2012
 Offaly Minor Hurling Championship (14): 2012

Notable players
 Stephen Byrne
 Colm Cassidy
 Dan Currams
 Liam Currams
 Cathal Kiely
 Noel Mitchell
 Dylan Murray
 Danny Owens
 Jack Screeney
 Ciarán Slevin
 Mick Spain

References

External links
Official Site

Gaelic games clubs in County Offaly
Hurling clubs in County Offaly
Gaelic football clubs in County Offaly